Stefan Heid (born 28 December 1961 in Bad Homburg vor der Höhe) is a German Catholic priest, church historian and Christian archaeologist. Since 2020 he is rector of the Pontifical Institute of Christian Archeology. Heid is also since 2011 director of the Roman Institute of the Görres-Society.

Early life and formation

Heid was born in Bad Homburg vor der Höhe in 1961. He is alumnus of the Kaiserin-Friedrich-Gymnasium. In 1991 he finished his studies in Catholic theology, Christian archeology and Classical Philology at University of Bonn  with the doctorate in Theology. In 2000, also at University of Bonn, he earned the habilitation for Ancient Church History, Patrology and Christian Archeology with the thesis Kreuz – Jerusalem – Kosmos. Aspekte frühchristlicher Staurologie.

Priestly ministry

On 10 June 1994, Heid was ordained for the Roman Catholic Archdiocese of Cologne. From 1994 to 1996, he served as vicar of St. Servatius in Siegburg. Between 1999 and 2006, he was subsidiary vicar at the St. Quirinus church in Neuss, parallel to his duties in Rome.

During his postdoctoral studies from 1996 to 2012, Heid was enrolled in the Collegio Teutonico, serving for the last six years as its vice-rector. Since 1997 he is also a member of the Archconfraternity of Our Lady of Sorrows of the Germans and the Flemish in the Vatican.

Pope Benedict XVI elevated him on 29 December 1999, to the honorary rank of Monsignor.

Academic activity 

Since 2001 Heid has been teaching hagiography and liturgy at the Pontifical Institute of Christian Archeology. Since 2005 he is also visiting scholar at the Pontifical University of Saint Thomas Aquinas. In the academic year 2011–2012 he was research fellow at the Saint John's Seminary (Massachusetts). He is editor-in-chief of the  Römische Quartalschrift für Christliche Altertumskunde und Kirchengeschichte  and of the series Römischen Quartalschrift.Supplementbände. In 2015 he initiated the Roman Library Joseph Ratzinger – Benedikt XVI.

Publications 

 
 
 
 Haltung und Richtung. Grundformen frühchristlichen Betens. In: Internationale katholische Zeitschrift Communio. Bd. 38, Nr. 6, 2009, S. 611–619, (PDF; 50 KB).
 Gebetshaltung und Ostung in frühchristlicher Zeit. In: Rivista di Archeologia Cristiana. Bd. 82, 2006, S. 347–404, (PDF; 3 MB).

References 

German archaeologists
1961 births
German Roman Catholic priests
21st-century German Catholic theologians
20th-century German Catholic theologians
Living people